Fanaticism is a belief or behavior involving uncritical zeal or obsessive enthusiasm.
 Religious fanaticism, fanaticism related to a religion

Fanaticism, Fanatic(s), Fanatical or The Fanatics may also refer to:

 Fan (person), short for "fanatic", a person with a liking and enthusiasm for something
 FANatic, a U.S. TV show on the MTV network in the late 1990s
 Fanatic (album), a 2012 album by the band Heart
 Fanatic (film), a 1965 British thriller
 FANatical, a Canadian documentary television series
 Fanatical (company), a digital video game retailer
 Fanatic, a now defunct Games Workshop hobby, gaming, and Mordheim magazine
 "Fanatic", a song by Heidi Montag from her 2010 album Superficial
 The Fanatic (novel), a 2000 novel by James Robertson
 The Fanatic (2019 film), a thriller film starring John Travolta
 The Fanatics (film), a 1990s comedy film
 The Fanatics (game show), a 2015 British game show
 The Fanatic (novel), a novel by the Scottish author James Robertson
 The Finatticz, an American hip hop group
 Ocean Colour Scene, a band whose members formerly had a band called "The Fanatics"
 Fanatics, Inc., an American online retailer
 Fanatics (1917 film), an American silent drama film
 Fanatics (2012 film), a Finnish film
 Fanatics (group), a South Korean girl group

See also
 The Fantasticks, a 1960 musical
 Fanatik (disambiguation)
 Fnatic, an esports organisation
 Phillie Phanatic, mascot of the Philadelphia Phillies
 1589 Fanatica, asteroid named after Eva Perón